The Mayor of Derry City and Strabane District Council  is an honorary position bestowed upon a Citizen of Derry City & Strabane District in Northern Ireland, who is in practice a member of Derry and Strabane District Council, chosen by their peers on the Council to serve a one-year term. The Mayor is Chairman of the Council as well as the city's first citizen. The current Mayor is Sandra Duffy of Sinn Fein.

The district was created in 2015 by the merger of two existing councils. The previous post of Mayor of Derry, more formally Lord Mayor of Londonderry, has a long history. A provost, Sir Henry Docwra, was appointed in the initial city charter of 1604 by James I.  In 1613, this post was replaced with that of governor, or mayor, with John Rowley being the first to serve.  The City charter of 1665 which provided:

During much of its history, it has been held by unionists (largely due to the practice of gerrymandering), but in recent years, the majority of mayors have been Irish nationalists, reflecting the majority of the city's population.

From 1921 until 1969, the Lord Mayor was automatically entitled to a seat in the Senate of Northern Ireland.

List of mayors

17th century

18th century

19th century

20th century

21st century

References

External links
Members of the Northern Ireland Assembly, 1921 - 72

 
Mayor
1613 establishments in Ireland
Derry